The strawberry crab, Hawaiian strawberry crab or red boxing crab, Neoliomera pubescens, is a small, bright pink crab found in the Indo-Pacific region, including around Hawaii, French Polynesia and Mauritius. It has small white bumps on the main shell and whitish claws.

References

Xanthoidea
Crustaceans described in 1834